Geoff Bryan (born 1956) is a New Zealand television broadcaster, currently a newsreader for MediaWorks Radio and one of the breakfast hosts on Magic.

Career
Bryan was born in Kent, England, and moved with his family to Australia first and then to Wellington when he was a child, in the late 1960s. He completed a degree in Political Science and History at Victoria University of Wellington, before working in radio, including as a DJ for 2ZM in Wellington in the late 1970s and 1980s. He progressed into television in 1982, and became a sports presenter for TVNZ in 1987. Bryan, along with Keith Quinn and John McBeth were laid off by TVNZ 2007, before the company invited all three to compete for a single vacancy in Auckland. He was the successful applicant and is still employed by TVNZ.

Bryan was a newsreader for Radio Live but now reads for MagicTalk.  He was previously a breakfast co-host on The Sound and a news presenter for The Radio Network. He began with the IRN News Centre as breakfast newsreader, and then became part of the Newstalk ZB News team when IRN combined with the Newstalk ZB Newsroom. He was part of the Affiliates unit, which is based in the Auckland newsroom of Newstalk ZB, and produces bulletins for many commercial stations around the country, including other stations of The Radio Network. He remained a breakfast newsreader for the Affiliates unit until mid-2009, when his position was combined with another role, and he was made redundant. However, he remains working on contract and is a regular fill-in newsreader on both the Newstalk ZB Network, and the Affiliates bulletins.

Personal life
He is married with four young adult children and lives in Auckland.

See also
 List of New Zealand television personalities

References

External links
 
 NZ Listener interview 2008

1956 births
Living people
New Zealand television presenters
Victoria University of Wellington alumni
Radio Live